This was the first edition of the tournament as a WTA 125 tournament.

Tereza Mihalíková and Aldila Sutjiadi won the title, defeating Ashlyn Krueger and Elizabeth Mandlik in the final, 7–5, 6–2.

Seeds

Draw

Draw

References

External links 
Main draw

Abierto Tampico – Doubles